The cuneiform sign tap, or tab (also ṭab and TAB), is a common use sign in the Amarna letters and the Epic of Gilgamesh. It is used syllabically for tab, tap, ṭap, or TAB, (TAB as parts of personal names, places, or common words, etc.), and alphabetically for "t" (or "ṭ"), or "a". (All the 4 vowels, a, e, i, o are interchangeable.)

Epic of Gilgamesh use
For the Epic of Gilgamesh, the following usage is found in Tablets I-XII: tab-(12 times); tap-(25); ṭap-(2); and TAB, (6 times).

References

Held, Schmalstieg, Gertz, 1987. Beginning Hittite. Warren H. Held, Jr, William R. Schmalstieg, Janet E. Gertz, c. 1987, Slavica Publishers, Inc. w/ Glossaries, Sign List, Indexes, etc., 218 pages.
Moran, William L. 1987, 1992. The Amarna Letters. Johns Hopkins University Press, 1987, 1992. 393 pages.(softcover)
 Parpola, 1971. The Standard Babylonian Epic of Gilgamesh, Parpola, Simo, Neo-Assyrian Text Corpus Project, c 1997, Tablet I thru Tablet XII, Index of Names, Sign List, and Glossary-(pp. 119–145), 165 pages.

Cuneiform signs